Birla Planetarium may refer to:

Birla Planetarium, Chennai
Birla Planetarium, Hyderabad
Birla Planetarium, Kolkata

See also
List of planetariums